Black Caviar is an American DJ duo from New York City, consisting of Troy Hinson and Jared Piccone. Black Caviar produced "What’s Up Danger", which was featured on the Spider-Man: Into the Spider-Verse soundtrack.

History

2015–2017 
In 2015, Hinson and Piccone started producing music under the name Black Caviar. Before founding Black Caviar, Piccone and Hinson had started their careers playing in Pennsylvania rock bands, which is how they met. Hinson is known for his work on Sirius XM's Jim Norton & Sam Roberts Show. Piccone was the cofounder and drummer of Innerpartysystem, and later worked as an A&R representative at Casablanca Records.

In 2015, Black Caviar gained popularity with their cover of "Lady (Hear Me Tonight)" by Modjo.

2017–2019 
Black Caviar signed to Casablanca Records in 2017, and released their debut single "Coco" in November. The single peaked at 22 on Billboard's Dance/Mix Show Airplay charts in February 2018. In 2018, a remix of "Coco" by Piccone's former Innerpartysystem bandmate Kris Barman (better known as Wuki) was released.

Black Caviar's "What's Up Danger" was released on November 1, 2018, as the second single from the Spider-Man: Into the Spider-Verse soundtrack. The single was a collaboration with rapper Blackway. The soundtrack reached number one on Billboard's Top Soundtracks and number 2 on Billboard 200. Black Caviar released an official dance remix of "What's Up Danger" in February, 2019.

Black Caviar produced several singles in the summer of 2019, including "El Camino", "Alright Alright Okay", "Zonin",<ref name=":2">{{Cite web|last=Artvoice|date=2019-06-09|title=Black Caviar and G.L.A.M. Link Up on Slick New Singles "Alright Alright, Okay" & "Zonin'|url=https://artvoice.com/2019/06/08/black-caviar-and-g-l-a-m-link-up-on-slick-new-singles-alright-alright-okay-zonin/|access-date=2021-03-09|website=Artvoice|language=en-US}}</ref> and "Do You Like It When I'm Freaky". Black Caviar collaborated with the DJ trio Jaded and London-based duo Antony and Cleopatra for the single "Slippin". The duo hinted at new releases and movie work in a 2019 interview. Black Caviar released an EP titled "Boing/Keep My High" on October 22, 2019. Black Caviar remixed the "Charlie's Angel Theme" for the 2019 Charlie's Angels soundtrack.

The duo released their second EP, Moon Landing, on November 22, 2019. On December 6, 2020 the duo released the official cover of Justin Caruso's "Broken Hearts".

 2020–present 
In January 2020, Black Caviar self-released their EP Caviar Chronicles Vol. 1. In June 2020 they released "Stacks On My Feet" on Tchami's record label Confession. Black Caviar collaborated with Norwegian DJ duo KREAM on the single "Jack".

Black Caviar collaborated with Blackway once again on the single "Do The Damn Thing", released November 22, 2020. Black Caviar released three more singles, "Hometown", "Money Money" and "Own My Own Masters" in 2021.

 Influences 
Black Caviar's music has been described as producing hip hop influenced dance music, which includes elements of the EDM, house, R&B and Latin genres. In an interview with EDM Identity'', Black Caviar listed The Chemical Brothers, Timbaland Fatboy Slim, and Daft Punk as influences

Discography

Singles

Remixes 
List of official remixes, showing original artists and record label

References 

Male musical duos
Electronic music duos
Hip hop duos
American record producers